Martin Krampelj (born March 10, 1995) is a Slovenian professional basketball player for MKS Dąbrowa Górnicza of the Polish Basketball League (PLK). He played college basketball for the Creighton Bluejays.

Early career
Krampelj was a member of youth categories at Grosuplje and later Krka.

College career
In 2015, Krampelj announced his decision to attend the Creighton University in the United States and play for the Creighton Bluejays. Krampelj averaged 11.9 points and 8.1 rebounds per game as a redshirt sophomore, hitting 67.1-percent of his field goals. However, he tore his ACL in a game against Seton Hall on January 17, 2018 and was forced to miss the rest of the season. As a redshirt junior, Krampelj averaged 13.5 points and 6.9 rebounds per game, shooting 59.2 percent from the floor. He was named Honorable Mention All-Big East and led the Bluejays to a 20-15 record, advancing to the quarterfinals of the National Invitation Tournament. After the season, he opted to forego his final season of eligibility and enter the NBA draft.

Professional career

Cedevita Olimpija (2019–2020)
After going undrafted in the 2019 NBA draft, Krampelj was named a member of the Denver Nuggets for the 2019 NBA Summer League.

On 12 July 2019, Krampelj signed his first professional contract with Cedevita Olimpija.

Loan to MoraBanc Andorra (2019–2020)
On 18 December 2019, MoraBanc Andorra announced that they had added Krampelj to their roster on loan from Cedevita Olimpija.

GTK Gliwice (2020)
On 20 August 2020, Krampelj signed with GTK Gliwice of the PLK. In seven games he averaged 10.0 points, 6.1 rebounds, 1.4 assists and 1.9 steals per game. Krampelj parted ways with the team on October 9.

Sioux Falls Skyforce (2021–2022)
In October 2021, Krampelj joined the Sioux Falls Skyforce from the available player pool. On 3 February 2022, Krampelj was removed from the team by the Skyforce.

On 10 February 2022, Krampelj was reacquired and activated by Sioux Falls. He playec 31 games and averaged 9.5 points, 5.4 rebounds and 1.1 assists in 19.5 minutes.

Aguada (2022)
In April 2022, Krampelj signed with Aguada from the Uruguayan League.

Hamilton Honey Badgers (2022)
On 5 May 2022, Krampelj signed with the Hamilton Honey Badgers of the CEBL.

MKS Dąbrowa Górnicza (2022–present)
On September 20, 2022, he has signed with MKS Dąbrowa Górnicza of the Polish Basketball League (PLK).

References

External links
 Creighton Bluejays bio
 College Statistics at espn.com

1995 births
Living people
BC Andorra players
Expatriate basketball people in Andorra
Club Atlético Aguada players
Creighton Bluejays men's basketball players
KK Cedevita Olimpija players
Liga ACB players
MKS Dąbrowa Górnicza (basketball) players
Power forwards (basketball)
Sioux Falls Skyforce players
Slovenian expatriate basketball people in the United States
Slovenian men's basketball players
Basketball players from Ljubljana